Don Dickinson (born December 27, 1974) is a Canadian writer and actor, born in Prince Albert, Saskatchewan on December 27, 1947. He was a shortlisted nominee for the Governor General's Award for English-language fiction at the 1991 Governor General's Awards for his short story collection Blue Husbands, and for the 1993 Books in Canada First Novel Award for his novel The Crew. Blue Husbands was also a winner of the Ethel Wilson Fiction Prize in 1992.

Dickinson has published one other short story collection and three novels. A graduate of the University of Saskatchewan and the University of British Columbia, he worked primarily as a school teacher in Lillooet, British Columbia. He served on the jury for the Governor General's Awards in 1996.

Works
Fighting the Upstream (1987)
Blue Husbands (1991)
The Crew (1993)
Robbiestime (2000)
Rag and Bone Man (2019)

References

Living people
Canadian male novelists
Canadian male short story writers
20th-century Canadian novelists
21st-century Canadian novelists
People from Lillooet
Writers from British Columbia
20th-century Canadian short story writers
21st-century Canadian short story writers
20th-century Canadian male writers
21st-century Canadian male writers
1947 births